Philippe Furrer (born June 16, 1985) is a Swiss former professional ice hockey player who played in the National League (NL).

Playing career
He was selected by the New York Rangers in the 6th round (179th overall) of the 2003 NHL Entry Draft.

Furrer joined Lugano on a three-year contract on April 11, 2015, after playing with SC Bern from the age of 6 and spending the entirety of his professional career, 14 seasons, with Bern.

International play
Furrer participated at the 2011 IIHF World Championship as a member of the Switzerland men's national ice hockey team.

Career statistics

Regular season and playoffs

International

References

External links

1985 births
Living people
SC Bern players
HC Fribourg-Gottéron players
Ice hockey players at the 2010 Winter Olympics
SC Langenthal players
HC Lugano players
New York Rangers draft picks
Swiss ice hockey defencemen
Olympic ice hockey players of Switzerland
Ice hockey people from Bern
Ice hockey players at the 2018 Winter Olympics